Greece competed at the 2022 Mediterranean Games in Oran, Algeria from 25 June to  6 July 2022.

Medal summary

Medal table

|  style="text-align:left; width:78%; vertical-align:top;"|

|  style="text-align:left; width:22%; vertical-align:top;"|

References

Nations at the 2022 Mediterranean Games
2022
Mediterranean Games